VGN is an initialism that could refer to:

VGN, reporting mark of the former Virginian Railway (1907–1959)
Verkehrsverbund Großraum Nürnberg ("Transport Association of the Greater Nürnberg Area"), mass transit agency in the Nuremberg Metropolitan Region, Germany